Nuttanicha Dungwattanawanich (born April 12, 1996), nicknamed Nychaa, is a Thai actress and model. She is currently seen on Channel 3. She is best known for her roles in the television dramas such as Sapai Jao (2015), Nang Ai (2016), Plerng Prang Tian (2019), Watsana Rak (2020), and Duang Jai Nai Montra (2021).

Early life
Nychaa was born in Chiang Mai, Thailand. She is the middle child in a family of three. Nychaa finished secondary school from Srivikorn School. She graduated from Bangkok University with a bachelor's degree in Communication Arts.

Career
Nychaa started working in the Thai entertainment industry in 2013 with the big hit TV drama  Tong Neu Gao. She continued to play the supporting role and second lead in several TV dramas Cubic, Sam Bai Mai Thao, Mafia Luerd Mungkorn: Raed, and Sapai Jao (2015). In 2016, Nychaa got her first leading role in the TV drama Nang Ai 2016. 

In 2021, Nychaa make her big-screen debut with the horror film “Ghost Lab” by a popular production GDH.

Personal life
Nychaa dated Thai politician Parit Wacharasindhu for three years before they broke up in 2017.
There are rumors that she and Phakin Khamwilaisak are dating. However, both confirm that they are just "co-stars". They met while filming for The Cupids Series.

Filmography

Film

Dramas

Music video appearances

Discography

Soundtracks

Concerts

Awards and nominations

References

External links
 
 

1996 births
Living people
Nuttanicha Dungwattanawanich
Nuttanicha Dungwattanawanich
Nuttanicha Dungwattanawanich
Nuttanicha Dungwattanawanich
Nuttanicha Dungwattanawanich
Nuttanicha Dungwattanawanich